The 1343 tsunami struck the Tyrrhenian Sea and Bay of Naples on 25 November 1343. Underground shocks were felt in Naples and caused significant damage and loss of lives. Of major note was a tsunami created by the earthquake which destroyed many ships in Naples and destroyed many ports along the Amalfi Coast including Amalfi itself. The effects of the tsunami were observed by the poet Petrarch, whose ship was forced to return to port, and recorded in the fifth book of his Epistolae familiares. A 2019 study attributes the event to a massive submarine landslide (possibly greater than 1 km3), caused by flank collapse of the Stromboli volcano.

See also
 List of earthquakes in Italy
 List of historical earthquakes
 List of tsunamis in Europe

References

Naples earthquake
1343
1343 in Europe
14th century in the Kingdom of Naples
Naples earthquake
Naples earthquake
Joanna I of Naples